Arduin the Lombard (or Arduin of Melfi;) was a Greek-speaking Lombard nobleman who fought originally for the Byzantines on Sicily and later against them as the leader of a band of Norman mercenaries.

He was the leader of the troops committed by Guaimar IV of Salerno to George Maniakes' Sicilian expedition in 1038. According to Amatus of Montecassino, he refused to surrender a captured horse to the Byzantine general and Maniakes consequently had him stripped and beaten. Whatever happened, Arduin and his Salernitan contingent along with the Normans (also sent by Guaimar) and the Varangians (sent by Emperor Constantine IX) abandoned Sicily and returned to the mainland.  

On the peninsula, the Byzantine catepan of Italy, Michael Doukeianos, appointed him topoterites of Melfi. He soon revolted against Greek authority in Apulia and he and his Normans joined the rebellion-in-progress of Argyrus. First, the nominal leader of the insurrection, Atenulf, brother of Pandulf III of Benevento, defected to the Greeks and then Argyrus, his successor. The Normans, bypassing Arduin (who may also have been bought off by the Greeks), chose their own successor to Argyrus, William Iron Arm, and Arduin faded completely out of view.

Sources 
 Norwich, John Julius. The Normans in the South 1016-1130. London: Longman, 1967.
 Loud, Graham Anthony. The Age of Robert Guiscard: Southern Italy and the Norman Conquest. Harlow: Longman/Pearson Education, 2000.   11th-century Byzantine people

11th-century Lombard people
Byzantine generals
Byzantine rebels
Lombard warriors